The 1922 Kent State Silver Foxes football team represented Kent State during the 1922 college football season. In its third season of intercollegiate football, all under head coach Paul G. Chandler, the team compiled a 0–7 record and was outscored by a total of 146 to 0. In three seasons under coach Chandler, Kent State did not score a point or win a game on the field, the sole victory coming by forfeit in 1920. Paul Spangler was the team's captain.

Schedule

References

Kent State
Kent State Golden Flashes football seasons
Kent State Golden Flashes football
College football winless seasons